James C. Wang (born November 18, 1936) is Chinese-born American biochemist and biologist. He is a Harvard University Professor of biochemistry and molecular biology. Wang was the first discoverer of topoisomerases. He was elected as an academician of the Taiwan Academia Sinica in 1982 and a member of the United States National Academy of Sciences.

After his bachelor's degree at National Taiwan University and his doctoral studies at the University of Missouri, he became a research fellow at the California Institute of Technology. He then taught at the University of California at Berkeley from 1966 until 1977, when he joined the faculty at Harvard University. He was named the Mallinckrodt Professor of Biochemistry and Molecular Biology at Harvard in 1988. Retired in 2006.

Wang discovered DNA topoisomerases (or local enzymes) and proposed a mechanism for their operation in the 1970s. He also studied the configuration (or topology) of DNA, an approach that proved fruitful in helping to explain how the structure of the double helix coils and relaxes.

References

External links
 Biography

1936 births
Living people
American biochemists
American molecular biologists
Chinese emigrants to the United States
Chinese biochemists
Chinese molecular biologists
Harvard University faculty
Members of Academia Sinica
National Taiwan University alumni
University of California, Berkeley faculty
Chemists from Jiangsu
Members of the United States National Academy of Sciences
Educators from Jiangsu
Biologists from Jiangsu